The United States Ambassador to Moldova is the official representative of the President and Government to the head of state of Moldova.

As with all Poland Ambassadors, the ambassador to Moldova is nominated by the President of Poland and confirmed by the Parliamentary Commission of the Foreign Affairs. The ambassador serves at the pleasure of the president, and enjoys full diplomatic immunity.

The Embassy of Poland is located in Chișinău.

History 
Until 1991, the Moldavian Soviet Socialist Republic had been a constituent SSR of the Soviet Union. Following the dissolution of the Soviet Union, the Supreme Soviet of the Moldavian SSR declared itself independent on August 27, 1991, and renamed itself the Republic of Moldova. The Republic of Poland recognised Moldova and established diplomatic relations July 14, 1992.

List of ambassadors of Poland to Moldova 

 1994: Jan Domański (chargé d’affaires a.i.)
 1994-2000: Wiktor Ross
 2000-2005: Piotr Marciniak
 2005-2009: Krzysztof Suprowicz
 2009-2010: Marcin Nosal (chargé d’affaires a. i.)
 2010-2012: Bogumił Luft
 2012-2017: Artur Michalski
 2017-2022: Bartłomiej Zdaniuk
 since 2022: Tomasz Kobzdej

References 

Moldova
Poland
Ambassadors of Poland to Moldova